The Asian Football Confederation's Pre-Olympic Tournament was held from 3 April 1999 to 13 November 1999.  Thirty-five teams entered the qualification for the three allocated spots for the 2000 Summer Olympics Football tournament in Sydney.

The qualification saw Korea Republic, Japan and Kuwait winning their final round groups and qualifying to the Olympics.

Format 
Asian berths for the final is 3.

First round
35 teams were grouped into 9 groups, where each group would consist of round-robin tournament. The winners of each group would qualify to the finals. 12 teams from West Asia were grouped into 4 groups of 3 teams each, 5 teams from Central Asia were grouped into one group, 18 teams from East Asia, South Asia and Southeast Asia were grouped into 4 groups of 4 or 5 teams each.
Final round
9 teams were grouped into 3 groups of 3 teams each, where each group would consist of home and away round-robin tournament. The winners of each group would qualify to the finals.

First round
The first round was played in nine groups held from 3 April 1999 to 24 July 1999. The winner of each group will  be promoted to the final round.

Group 1

Group 2

Group 3

Group 4

Group 5

Group 6

Group 7

Group 8

Group 9

Final round
The final round was played in three groups of three teams each held from 1 October to 13 November 1999. The winner of each group will represent Asia at the 2000 Olympic Games.

Group A

Kuwait qualify to the 2000 Summer Olympics Football tournament in Sydney.

Group B

South Korea qualify to the 2000 Summer Olympics Football tournament in Sydney.

Group C

Japan qualify to the 2000 Summer Olympics Football tournament in Sydney.

Asian
2000